Following is a list of all Article III United States federal judges appointed by President James Monroe during his presidency. In total Monroe appointed 22 Article III federal judges, including 1 Justice to the Supreme Court of the United States and 21 judges to the United States district courts.

United States Supreme Court justices

District courts

Notes

Renominations

References
General

 

Specific

Sources
 Federal Judicial Center

Judicial appointments
Monroe